John Lafayette Merriam (February 6, 1825 – January 12, 1895) was a Minnesota banker, politician and Speaker of the Minnesota House of Representatives, representing St. Paul. He was instrumental in helping to organize First National Bank of Minnesota, and he served as vice president of Merchants National Bank.

Merriam was the son of Jane (Ismon) and William Strong Merriam. He began service in the Minnesota House of Representatives in 1870, and was elected speaker that year, serving in the position until 1871. His son, William R. Merriam, later served as speaker of the house in 1887, and was elected governor in 1888.

References

1825 births
1895 deaths
Republican Party members of the Minnesota House of Representatives
Speakers of the Minnesota House of Representatives
People from Essex, New York
19th-century American politicians